Natural sponge may refer to:
Luffa aegyptiaca, plant fibre sponge
Sea sponge, animal fibre sponge

ca:Esponja natural